To America with Love: Letters from the Underground is a 1976 book by Anita and Abbie Hoffman. It was part of the basis for the film Steal This Movie! in 2000.

Editions
New York: Stonehill Pub. Co.: [distributed by G. Braziller], c1976.  (1st edition)) paperback reprint)

American biographies